The Oakland Zoo is a zoo located in the Grass Valley neighborhood of Oakland, California, United States. Established on June 6, 1922, it is managed by the Conservation Society of California, a 501(c)(3) non-profit organization dedicated to the conservation of wildlife both locally and globally. The zoo is home to more than 850 native and exotic animals. It is recognized for its outstanding leadership in animal welfare, animal care, particularly its elephant care program, its rescue, rehabilitation and conservation programs and for its Leed-certified, 17,000-square-foot, state-of-the-art veterinary hospital—the largest wild animal veterinary facility in Northern California. Oakland Zoo is the recipient of numerous "Best of" awards, including 30 Best U.S. Zoos by U.S. News & World Report and "10 Best" by USA Today Reader’s Choice Awards.

On July 12, 2018, the Oakland Zoo opened the California Trail, focusing on the state's remarkable native wildlife—both past and present.

Establishment
Naturalist Henry A. Snow established the Oakland Zoo on June 6, 1922 - originally located at 19th and Harrison streets in downtown Oakland. Snow Park now occupies the site of the zoo's first home. Over the years the zoo relocated several times: to Sequoia Park, Joaquin Miller Park and finally in 1939 to Durant Park. Under Joseph R. Knowland, chairman of the California State Park Commission, California purchased the land and in 1950 renamed the park to Joseph Knowland State Arboretum and Park.[1]

Conservation Society of California 
In 1936, Henry A Snow's son, Sidney Snow, established the nonprofit organization East Bay Zoological Society, which was originally known as the Alameda County Botanical and Zoological Society. The East Bay Zoological Society operated and managed the Zoo for the City of Oakland from 1982 until August 2017, when it was renamed the Conservation Society of California to better reflect the Zoo’s evolving purpose and mission in its commitment to conservation.

Governed by a volunteer Board of Trustees, the Conservation Society of California manages and operates Oakland Zoo.

With over 25 wildlife conservation partners globally, the zoo provides funds to support their programs and efforts to save wildlife. Through their partnerships with California Department of Fish & Wildlife, they accept, rehabilitate, and re-home wildlife rescued from wildfire and human-wildlife conflict. This has included 22 mountain lions, 38 California condors, 8 bears, and over 600 yellow-legged frogs.

Expansion
New exhibits have been created, including those for the hamadryas baboons and the chimpanzees. A spacious elephant exhibit was built in 1987. The sun bear exhibit was finished in 1995 and was featured on Animal Planet Ultimate Zoos. The white-handed gibbons live on a lush island in the heart of the Rainforest on Gibbon Island. The African Savannah, with camels, lions, elephants, meerkats, hyenas and more, was completed in 1998.

The Education Center opened its doors in 1999 with the main entrance followed soon after in summer 2001. In autumn of 2001, a squirrel monkey exhibit opened along with a larger, renovated tiger exhibit. In the spring of 2007, the four dromedary camels were moved to a larger, fenced enclosure uphill from their old enclosure. 

Oakland zoo provides free and discounted science education programs for underserved students attending Title 1 schools in the Greater Bay Area. It gives 5,500 vouchers every year to schools and community organizations as part of its Zoo-to Community program. It reaches an average of 3,000+ students and 1,000+ adults with this program during the school year.

In 2012, a fully funded LEED-certified Veterinary Hospital opened, followed by the opening in 2013 of the Oakland Zoo Biodiversity Center, and the 2014 inauguration of the Condor Recovery Center at Oakland Zoo. Each of these projects has improved care of the zoo's animals as well as conservation of the species in the wild.

California Trail
California Trail represents $70 million out of an $81 million multi-phase zoo development.

Through live native animal and plant habitats, the Zoo highlights the delicate balance between humans and nature, and the impact of change on all three.

Guests travel to the Trail via an aerial gondola from the existing zoo. Along the trail, they encounter various animals, such as bears, wolves, mountain lions, bison and birds of prey. A half-acre California Wilds! playground introduces young children and their families to California wildlife and habitats through themed play structures. Inside the Conservation Habitarium - with a wall-length window into the grizzly bear habitat, visitors explore California's diverse habitats, step into the shoes of conservation researchers, and find their place as a member of a community of people taking action for California's wildlife. The project was designed by Noll & Tam Architects and built by C. Overaa & Co.

‍“California Trail is an example of the Oakland Zoo’s leadership in captive animal welfare, and its commitment to providing natural and enriched environments to promote species-typical behaviors for captive wildlife. California Trail is a model for other zoological facilities, sending the critical message that zoos have an important role to play in the rescue, rehabilitation, and care of wildlife...Oakland Zoo has long prioritized common sense and welfare, and PETA looks forward to continued collaboration on improving the welfare of captive wildlife across the U.S.” -Brittany Peet, Esq., Director, Captive Animal Law Enforcement PETA Foundation

The Wayne and Gladys Valley Children's Zoo
In the summer of 2005 the  Valley Children's Zoo opened with spacious new animal exhibits along with plenty of interactive play-structures for children. The lemurs, tortoises, the interactive Goat and Sheep Contact Yard along with the river otters can be found in the Children's Zoo. Alligators, bats, pigs, and rabbits along with the Bug Room, and the Reptile and Amphibian Discovery Room are also in the Children's Zoo. One feature popular with younger children is brass insects embedded in the concrete walkways, which were installed as a form of public art.

Exhibitions
The zoo is home to more than 850 native and exotic animals and is a member of the AZA. The following animals are on exhibit to the public:

Flamingo Plaza
 African spoonbill
 Lesser flamingo

Tropical Rainforest

 Blue-and-yellow macaw
 Chimpanzee
 Common squirrel monkey
 Cotton-top tamarin
 Great curassow
 Guira cuckoo
 Hadada ibis
 Lar gibbon
 Military macaw
 Red-rumped agouti
 Siamang
 Southern pudu
 Sun bear
 Tiger

African Savanna

 African bush elephant
 African lion
 African sacred ibis
 Ball python
 Black-throated monitor
 Blue-bellied roller
 Common warthog
 Dromedary camel
 Egyptian goose
 Fischer's lovebird
 Giant plated lizard
 Grant's zebra
 Hamadryas baboon
 Hamerkop 
 Klipspringer
 Meerkat
 Pancake tortoise
 Pied crow
 Red-bellied parrot
 Red-tailed monkey
 Reticulated giraffe
 Rock hyrax
 Speckled pigeon
 Spotted hyena
 Sudan plated lizard
 Superb starling
 Taveta weaver
 White-faced whistling duck

Wayne and Gladys Valley Children's Zoo

 African spurred tortoise
 Aldabra giant tortoise
 Amazon tree boa
 American alligator
 Asian forest scorpion
 Black beauty stick insect
 Black tree monitor
 Black widow spider
 Blue spiny lizard
 Brown anole
 Caribbean giant cockroach
 Chilean rose tarantula
 Chuckwalla
 Colombian red-tailed boa
 Common carrion beetle
 Crowned lemur
 Desert tortoise
 Domestic rabbit
 Dyeing poison dart frog
 Eastern box turtle
 Florida red-bellied cooter
 Giant African millipede
 Giant vinegaroon
 Gila monster
 Goat
 Golden mantella
 Golfodulcean poison frog
 Green and black poison dart frog
 Green anole
 Green mantella
 Guinea Hog
 Henkel's leaf-tailed gecko
 Island flying fox
 Jungle nymph
 Large flying fox
 Leafcutter ant
 Madagascar hissing cockroach
 Mission golden-eyed tree frog
 North American river otter
 Panamanian golden frog
 Ring-tailed lemur
 Spotted turtle
 Three-toed box turtle
 Yellow-banded poison dart frog

Wild Australia
 Agile wallaby
 Common wallaroo
 Emu

California Trail
 American bison
 American black bear
 Bald eagle
 California condor
 Gray wolf
 Grizzly bear
 Jaguar
 Mountain lion
 Red-tailed hawk

Glowfari

Glowfari is a light event hosted by the Zoo from February 12 to March 13, 2021. It is a light show featuring larger-than-life lantern animals. The path is one mile long and features more than 100 animals, and more than 800 other light displays. There are three worlds: Aquatic, Ecosystem/Food chain, and Jurassic.

Gallery

References

External links

Zoos in California
San Francisco Bay Area amusement parks
Tourist attractions in Oakland, California
Buildings and structures in Oakland, California
1922 establishments in California
Zoos established in 1922